The first Congregational Church in New Zealand was formed in 1840 by Rev. Barzillai Quaife, who was a missionary to the Maori. This cause did not give rise to any lasting church, neither did one formed in New Plymouth in February 1842. Mr. Jonas Woodward, a leading businessman in Wellington, founded the Congregational church in Wellington in May 1842, and because this gave rise to a long term church, it is considered by all as the first. There was considerable growth in both North and South Islands with churches established in Auckland in 1851, Dunedin in 1862 and Christchurch in 1864 and many other places also.  The 1875 Census lists the Congregational Independents as the fourth largest Protestant Denomination in Auckland, and the fifth largest in 'The Colony.' Initially because of lack of roads, two unions were formed, one in the North Island the other mainly in the South Island. These merged to form the Congregational Union of New Zealand (CUNZ) in 1884. In 1890s women were admitted to the Assembly as full members. In 1902 the Presbyterian church made overtures to the CUNZ and the Methodist Churches regarding church union. Discussions on this were held occasionally over many years but no real action was taken. However, in 1943 the Raglan Congregational church merged with the Presbyterian church to form the first Union church in New Zealand. In 2019 this church severed all ties with the Presbyterian and Methodist churches and became a Congregational church again. A few months later the Assembly of the CUNZ severed all ties with the Uniting Churches of Aotearoa New Zealand (UCANZ), as the body was now called.

From the very beginning the CUNZ had had strong links with the London Missionary Society, both in sending and supporting missionaries, so in 1947 it accepted responsibility for their work in churches in the Pacific islands of Samoa, Cook Islands, and Niue. In 1969 a majority of the ministers and churches associated with the CUNZ, including the Pacific Island Congregational Churches, split and merged with the Presbyterian Church of Aotearoa New Zealand. The minority remained as the Congregational Union of New Zealand. In the 50 years since that split, the number of churches has increased although still small and fluctuating having currently 670 members and 13 congregations.

It is a member of the World Evangelical Congregational Fellowship, and the Evangelical Fellowship of Congregational Churches

References

External links 
 

Congregationalism
Congregationalist denominations